The Korrespondent.net (literally: Correspondent) is an online newspaper in Ukraine launched in 2000. It is a sister project to the Korrespondent printed weekly magazine also containing the latter's reduced free online version. Korrespondent.net is a bilingual Ukrainian and Russian project while the magazine is Russian-only. It is part of United Media Holding group, created by Boris Lozhkin and owned by Serhiy Kurchenko.

Apart from the news, the site includes large and ever-growing blogging and civic photojournalism platforms.

Sections
The online newspaper publishes news in the following categories:
 Top-news
 Main events for the day
 Politics of Ukraine
 News from Ukraine
 Business and economy
 International news
 Russia
 Capital (Kyiv)
 The world about us (translation and reprint of international publications about Ukraine)
 OpEd
 Science and technology
 Entertainment and culture
 Sports
 Euro 2012
 Odd news
 Health

See also
Ukrayinska Pravda
Kyiv Post

References

External links
korrespondent.net (Ukrainian)
 korrespondent.net (Russian)
Yuliya McGuffie's personal blog

Ukrainian news websites
Russian-language websites
Ukrainian-language websites
Internet properties established in 2000
2000 establishments in Ukraine